Narrung is a town and locality in the Australian state of South Australia. It is situated at the northern extent of the Narrung Peninsula, which separates The Coorong from Lake Albert adjacent to The Narrows which separates Lake Albert from the larger Lake Alexandrina. The area of Narrung includes the Aboriginal (Ngarrindjeri) community of Raukkan.

This included 106 Aboriginal and/or Torres Strait Islander peoples who lived in the Raukkan community.

Narrung is located within the federal division of Barker, the state electoral district of MacKillop and the local government area of the Coorong District Council.

See also
List of crossings of the Murray River
Loveday Bay (South Australia)

References

Towns in South Australia